Al Marmoom Desert Conservation Reserve is the first unfenced nature conservation reserve in the United Arab Emirates. It is located in the desert area of Saih Al Salam in the emirate of Dubai and comprises some 10% of the total land area of the emirate, including the extensive man-made desert wetlands, Al Qudra Lakes.

Ecology and geography 
It provides a sanctuary for 19 animal species considered endangered, as well as flocks of between 300 and 500 flamingos and over 360 other bird species, of which 158 are migratory. Rare species observed at Al Marmoom include the Egyptian Nightjar Caprimulgus aegyptius and the giant skipper butterfly Coeliades anchises jucunda, which is native to the island of Socotra, off Yemen.

History 

Its announcement, in January 2018, followed public concern regarding the fouling of the area by tourists as well as a number of deaths of birds and fish in the lakes.

Management 
Al Marmoom is managed by Dubai Municipality. In Sep 2021, Dubai Tourism partnered with OceanAir Travels, Middle East Tours and activities leading company. The move to regulate camping, barbecuing and picnicking was welcomed by the Emirates Environmental Group (EEG), an organization that had organized cleanup campaigns in the area in the past.

The Marmoom Biosphere Centre is intended as a facility for studying the sustainable development and management of the reserve, as well as serving as a centre for sustainable ecotourism, and will aim to be the main source of specialized ecosystem management practices in the region.

Leisure activities 
The Reserve currently has a number of animal and bird observation platforms, star and sunset observation decks and an 84 km cycling track, one of the world's largest. There is an ongoing development program for the reserve, including bird breeding programs as well as the development of an outdoor theatre and other facilities intended to be powered by a 5,000 megawatt solar power plant. Al Marmoom is served by one of Dubai's distinctive 'Last Exit' food truck parks.

Star gazing events are often held at Al Marmoom by Dubai Astronomy Group as the area has little to no light pollution. Some 20 sporting and social events have taken place in the Reserve since its launch, including a junior fun day organized Pink Caravan, the UAE-based breast cancer awareness initiative.

The Bab Al Shams Desert Resort & Spa is situated close to the Reserve.

Tourist Attractions in Al Qudra 

 Expo 2020 Lake - shaped like the logo of Expo 2020 as a promotional tourist attraction.
 Love Lake - 2 hearts intersecting and trees that spell out the word love.
 Crescent Moon Lake - Lake shaped like a crescent moon with a small island in the middle.
 Al Qudra Lakes - Man-made lakes near the reserve.
 The Oryx Platform - Viewing platform shaped like the head of an oryx, located next to Expo 2020 Lake.

Archaeological site 

The Saruq Al Hadid Archaeological Site is situated within the Reserve. It was discovered in 2002 by the Ruler of Dubai, Mohammed bin Rashid Al Maktoum, who noticed unusual dune formations when flying over the site in his helicopter. Excavations revealed an extensive Iron Age metallurgical centre, with signs of occupation since the Upper Palaeolithic and Neolithic eras. Artefacts unearthed at Saruq Al Hadid include bronze, copper and iron work, including bronze and iron tools and weapons, gold jewellery, beads, pottery, stoneware and seals. Metalworker's tools and unfinished items show that the site was formerly a production centre.

A collection of artefacts from the site is housed at the Saruq Al-Hadid Archaeology Museum in the Shindaga Heritage area in a traditional barjeel building, which was built in 1928, and which belonged to Sheikh Juma bin Maktoum bin Hasher Al Maktoum.

See also 
 Al-Wathba Wetland Reserve, Abu Dhabi
 Dubai Desert Conservation Reserve
 Jebel Hafeet National Park, Abu Dhabi
 Mangrove National Park, Abu Dhabi
 Ras Al Khor, Dubai
 Sir Abu Nu'ayr, Sharjah
 Sir Bani Yas, Abu Dhabi
 Wadi Wurayah, Fujairah
 Wildlife of the United Arab Emirates

References

External links 

 AL MARMOOM DESERT CONSERVATION RESERVE
 AL MARMOOM DESERT CONSERVATION RESERVE (YouTube)
  (WordPress)

Nature reserves in the United Arab Emirates
History of Dubai
Parks in Dubai
Nature conservation in the United Arab Emirates
Protected areas established in 2018
2018 establishments in the United Arab Emirates